Osbert († 1231) was an early 13th-century cleric who held the position of Bishop of Dunblane (Scotland). A mandate for a new election was issued in January 1226 after the presumed resignation of Osbert's predecessor Radulf. Osbert's name (as "O.") appears in the cartulary of Cambuskenneth Abbey, dating 1227 x 1231, where he is called "Bishop of Strathearn". An unnamed bishop of Dunblane occurs in the Dunfermline Registrum, dating to April 1227, and this was certainly Osbert. He also appears in attendance at a council held in Dundee in 1230. He had become an Augustinian canon at Holyrood Abbey by the time of his recorded death in 1231.

References
 Cockburn, James Hutchison, The Medieval Bishops of Dunblane and Their Church, (Edinburgh, 1959)
 Watt, D. E. R., Fasti Ecclesiae Scotinanae Medii Aevi ad annum 1638, 2nd Draft, (St Andrews, 1969)

1231 deaths
Augustinian canons
Bishops of Dunblane
13th-century Scottish Roman Catholic bishops
Year of birth unknown